Petr Reinberk (born 23 May 1989) is a Czech football player who currently plays for Slovácko.

References

External links
 
 Guardian Football

1989 births
Living people
Czech footballers
Czech Republic youth international footballers
Czech Republic under-21 international footballers
Czech First League players
1. FC Slovácko players
MFK Vítkovice players
Association football midfielders